The 3M Championship was a professional golf tournament in Minnesota on the PGA Tour Champions, played annually 
at the TPC Twin Cities in Blaine, a suburb north of Minneapolis.  Based in Saint Paul, 3M was the main sponsor of the tournament.

It debuted  in 1993 as the Burnet Senior Classic, and was originally held at the Bunker Hills Golf Course in nearby Coon Rapids. After eight editions, the tournament moved to the year-old TPC Twin Cities in 2001, when 3M took over as sponsor. The purse in 2017 was $1.75 million, with a winner's share of $262,500.

Within the tournament was the "Greats of Golf Challenge," an exhibition scramble on Saturday among teams of former major winners and hall of famers of both genders. Recent participants include Jack Nicklaus, Gary Player, Lee Trevino, and 

In 2018, it was announced that the 2018 3M Championship would be the final playing of the event, as it would be replaced by the 3M Open on the PGA Tour starting in 2019. Kenny Perry was the final champion of the event, winning his third 3M Championship on August 5, 2018.

Winners

^ The 1998 event was shortened to 36 holes due to rain
Green highlight indicates scoring records

Multiple winners
Three players won this tournament more than once.

3 wins
Hale Irwin: 1997, 1999, 2002
Kenny Perry: 2014, 2015, 2018
2 wins
Bernhard Langer: 2009, 2012

References

External links

Coverage on the Champions Tour's official site
TPC Twin Cities − host since 2001
Bunker Hills Golf Club

PGA Tour Champions events
Golf in Minnesota
Recurring sporting events established in 1993
1993 establishments in Minnesota